Carlos Oliveira may refer to:

Carlos Oliveira (rower) (born 1943), Portuguese Olympic rower
Brother Carlos Oliveira (1989–present), Christian Exorcist, and deliverance minister
Carlos Oliveira (footballer), Cuban footballer
Carlos Alberto de Oliveira Júnior (born 1978), Brazilian footballer
Capone (footballer) (Carlos Alberto de Oliveira, born 1972), Brazilian footballer
Carlos de Oliveira (1921–1981), Portuguese poet and novelist
Carlitos Oliveira (born 1993), Portuguese footballer